The 1986 Commonwealth Heads of Government Meeting was the ninth Meeting of the Heads of Government of the Commonwealth of Nations.  It was held in London, the United Kingdom, between 3 August 1986 and 5 August 1986, and was hosted by that country's Prime Minister, Margaret Thatcher. This was a special meeting held in between the biennial CHOGMs in order to consider the recommendations of the Commonwealth Eminent Persons Group regarding economic sanctions against South Africa due to its policies of apartheid. British prime minister Margaret Thatcher's refusal to support mandatory sanctions resulted in an acrimonious meeting and almost led to a split in the Commonwealth. 
 

1986
Diplomatic conferences in the United Kingdom
20th-century diplomatic conferences
1986 conferences
1986 in international relations
1986 in the United Kingdom
United Kingdom and the Commonwealth of Nations
August 1986 events in the United Kingdom
1986 in London
Events in London
1980s in the City of Westminster